The Tennessee–Tombigbee Waterway (popularly known as the Tenn-Tom) is a  artificial U.S. waterway built in the 20th century from the Tennessee River to the junction of the Black Warrior-Tombigbee River system near Demopolis, Alabama. The Tennessee–Tombigbee Waterway links commercial navigation from the nation's midsection to the Gulf of Mexico.
Under construction for 12 years by the U.S. Army Corps of Engineers, the Tennessee–Tombigbee Waterway was completed in December 1984 at a total cost of nearly $2 billion.

The Tenn-Tom encompasses 17 public ports and terminals,  of land, and another  managed by state conservation agencies for wildlife habitat preservation and recreational use.

Early history and construction
First proposed in the Colonial period, the idea for a commercial waterway link between the Tennessee and Tombigbee rivers did not receive serious attention until the advent of river steamboat traffic in the early nineteenth century. It stimulated trade throughout the river cities, and the ability to get products to the Gulf Coast for overseas shipping. As steamboat efficiency gains caused water transport costs to decline, in 1875 engineers surveyed a potential canal route for the first time. They issued a negative report, emphasizing that prohibitive cost estimates kept the project from economic feasibility.

Enthusiasm for the project languished until the presidency of Franklin D. Roosevelt, who took office during the Great Depression and quickly conceived of investment in major infrastructure projects to put many of the unemployed to work. The development of the Tennessee River by the TVA, especially the construction of the Pickwick Lock and Dam in 1938, helped decrease the Tenn-Tom's potential economic costs and increase its potential benefits. Pickwick Lake's design included an embayment on its south shore at Yellow Creek, which would permit the design and construction of an entrance to a future southward waterway (leading to the Tombigbee River), should it be decided that such a waterway would be built in the future.

Later, construction (under World War II emergency authorization) of Kentucky Dam at Gilbertsville, Kentucky, near the mouth of the Tennessee River's confluence with the Ohio River, would complete the "northern" half of the future waterway. As early as 1941 the proposal was combined with those for other waterways, such as the St. Lawrence Seaway, with the aim of building broader political support. Also, in the early 1960s it was proposed that the canal could be created by use of atomic blasts.

As part of his "Southern Strategy" for election, Republican President Richard Nixon committed to the project. He included $1 million in the Corps of Engineers' 1971 budget to start construction of the Tenn-Tom. Funding shortages and legal challenges delayed construction until December 1972, but Nixon's efforts initiated official Tenn-Tom waterway construction.

The U.S. Army Corps of Engineers began work on the project in 1972. The project was completed on December 12, 1984, nearly two years ahead of schedule.

Political challenges
The $2 billion in required funding for the Tenn-Tom waterway was repeatedly attacked by elected representatives and political organizations. Opponents asserted that the estimated economic benefits of the waterway by the Corps of Engineers were unsupportable based on projected traffic volume. By 1977, the Tenn-Tom was one of many such Corps of Engineers projects that had been initiated in the belief that they would directly or indirectly return to the Treasury their cost(s) of construction. 

Immediately after his election in 1976, Democratic President Jimmy Carter announced a plan to slash Tenn-Tom federal funding, as part of broader reductions in federal spending. Carter, and the economic advisors recruited to his administration, objected to the "waste" of taxpayer dollars on "pork-barrel projects". But, after more than 6,500 waterway supporters attended a public hearing held in Columbus, Mississippi, as part of Carter's review of the proposed waterway, the President withdrew his opposition.

The Louisville and Nashville Railroad filed a series of lawsuits to halt construction of the waterway. Railroad companies, which served as a major transport alternative to river traffic and stood to potentially lose the most value from construction of the waterway, asserted that its construction violated the National Environmental Policy Act. Federal courts ruled in favor of the project.

Economic effects
When completed, the Tenn-Tom waterway's total cost was $1.992 billion, including non-federal costs. Some political and economic commentators derided the project as "pork-barrel politics at its worst". For the first few years after its completion, such criticism appeared valid. The Tennessee–Tombigbee Waterway had opened in the midst of an economic recession in the barge business, which resulted in initially disappointingly low use of the waterway.

The 1988 drought, however, closed the Mississippi River and shifted traffic to the Tenn-Tom canal. This coincided with an economic turnaround on the Tennessee-Tombigbee corridor, wherein trade tonnage and commercial investment increased steadily over several years.

The two primary commodities shipped via the Tenn-Tom are coal and timber products, together comprising about 70 percent of total commercial shipping on the waterway. Industries that use these natural resources have found the waterway to be their most cost-efficient mode of transportation. Other popular trade products carried on the Tenn-Tom include grain, gravel, sand, and iron.

A 2009 study by Troy University found that the waterway had contributed nearly $43 billion in direct, indirect, and induced economic benefits to the United States, including the direct creation of more than 29,000 jobs, and was replacing an annual average of 284,000 truckloads.

Divide Cut

The Divide Cut is a  canal that makes the connection to the Tennessee River. It connects Pickwick Lake on the Tennessee to Bay Springs Lake, at Mississippi Highway 30. The cut carries the waterway between the Tennessee River watershed, which eventually empties into the Ohio River, and the Tombigbee River watershed, which eventually empties into the Gulf of Mexico at Mobile.

Pickwick Lake is a popular location for water sports such as waterskiing and wakeboarding.

For construction of the Divide Cut, the entire town of Holcut, Mississippi, had to be removed and demolished. Today, the Holcut Memorial lies alongside the waterway on the previous site of the town.

Locks and dams

The waterway is composed of ten locks (listed below from north to south along the waterway); many are named after Southern politicians who supported the project:
 Jamie Whitten Lock and Dam; formerly named Bay Springs Lock and Dam – impounds Bay Springs Lake 
 G. V. Montgomery Lock; formerly named Lock E 
 John Rankin Lock; formerly named Lock D 
 Fulton Lock; located in Fulton, Mississippi, formerly named Lock C 
 Glover Wilkins Lock; located in Smithville, Mississippi, formerly named Lock B 
 Amory Lock; located in Amory, Mississippi, formerly named Lock A 
 Aberdeen Lock and Dam; located in Aberdeen, Mississippi – impounds Aberdeen Lake 
 John C. Stennis Lock and Dam; formerly named Columbus Lock and Dam – impounds Columbus Lake 
 Tom Bevill Lock and Dam; formerly named Aliceville Lock and Dam – impounds Aliceville Lake 
 Howell Heflin Lock and Dam; formerly named Gainesville Lock and Dam – impounds Gainesville Lake

Gallery

Notes

Further reading

External links

 U.S. Army Corps of Engineers
 Tennessee-Tombigbee Waterway Development Authority
 Tenn-Tom - A New Waterway For America

 
Lists of dams in the United States
Canals opened in 1984
1984 establishments in the United States
Canals in Alabama
Canals in Mississippi
Mississippi placenames of Native American origin
Alabama placenames of Native American origin